The 1937 Glasgow Springburn by-election occurred in Glasgow Springburn on 7 September 1937, which (unusually for a UK election) was a Tuesday.

It was caused by the death of George Hardie.  It was won by his widow Agnes Hardie.

Campaign
The main issue of discussion related not to local concerns, but national concerns of rearmament. There had been much debate within the Labour Movement, including the Labour Party and the Trades Union Congress, about the National Government's reaction to the emerging situation in Europe. This led eventually to a commitment not to reverse the rearmament program until the international situation had changed. The Conservative candidate, Colonel McInnes Shaw, was unable to speak at all for eight days during the campaign due to a throat illness and Mrs. Hardie gave only a brief address (with no questions) at an eve-of-poll address.

Result

References

See also
Glasgow Springburn (UK Parliament constituency)
List of United Kingdom by-elections (1931–1950)
George Hardie MP
Agnes Hardie MP

1937 in Scotland
1930s elections in Scotland
1937 elections in the United Kingdom
By-elections to the Parliament of the United Kingdom in Glasgow constituencies
1930s in Glasgow
Springburn